Frederick Ronald Birrell (7 December 1913 – 23 July 1985) was an Australian politician.

History
Born in Adelaide, South Australia, grandson of Robert Birrell (died 1880) and son of Frederick (c. 1877 – 31 July 1952) and May Birrell (née Moran), he was educated at state schools before becoming an auto worker. He served in the military from 1940 to 1946. From 1959 to 1963 he was the South Australian Secretary of the Vehicle Builders' Union, becoming its federal president 1961–1962. In 1958 he was president of the South Australian Trades and Labor Council. In 1963, he was elected to the Australian House of Representatives as the Labor member for Port Adelaide. He held the seat until his retirement in 1974. Birrell died in 1985.

Personal
Fred Birrell married Patricia Lundie, a daughter of Francis Walter Lundie, long time leader of the Amalgamated Shearers' Union, then the Australian Workers' Union, Councillor for the Corporation of the City of Adelaide and the Port Adelaide Council, Board member of the Royal Adelaide Hospital and the Royal Zoological Society of South Australia. He was a member of the 1934 Glenelg Tiger (SANFL) football premiership team.

Family relationship to Frederick William Birrell (1869–1939), South Australian typographer and MLA
Son of Andrew Birrell, if any, has not been found.

References

Australian Labor Party members of the Parliament of Australia
Members of the Australian House of Representatives for Port Adelaide
Members of the Australian House of Representatives
1913 births
1985 deaths
20th-century Australian politicians